Unión Atlético Trujillo was a Venezuelan football team. It was based in Valera, and played their home games at the Estadio Luis Loreto Lira.

History
Founded as Trujillanos FC B (Trujillanos FC's reserve team), it was renamed Unión Atlético Trujillo in 2007. After the expansion of Primera and Segunda División Venezolana, it achieved promotion in their first year.

In the end of 2008, the team was crowned champions of 2008 Torneo Apertura, achieving a first-ever promotion to the main category. However, in June 2009, prior to the 2009–10 season, the club was dissolved to become a part of Real Esppor; the latter achieved the top level promotion instead.

Honours
Segunda División Venezolana: Apertura 2008

References

External links
Football Database profile

Football clubs in Venezuela
Association football clubs established in 2007
Association football clubs disestablished in 2009
Trujillo (state)
2007 establishments in Venezuela
2009 disestablishments in Venezuela
Defunct football clubs in Venezuela